Pölsa is a traditional northern Swedish dish which has been compared to hash. The main ingredients are beef sinew, liver, heart, lung, onion, and barley, mixed with stock, black pepper, and marjoram. Sometimes ground beef or minced pork is added. It is usually served with mashed or boiled potatoes and pickled beetroot, and sometimes a fried egg.

Background
The dish plays a central role in the allegorical novel Pölsan (2002)  by Swedish  author Torgny Lindgren (1938–2017), in which two men go on a personal quest across postwar Sweden in search of the genuine Swedish "pölsa".

The Norwegian and Danish word pølse means sausage and even if the two dishes don't look the same, the two words are related. Pölsa is simply a traditional variety of sausage filling without any casing.

See also 
Pyttipanna- similar food from Scandinavia
 Labskaus-  similar food from Northern Germany
 lobscouse- similar food from Norway
 Scouse (food)- similar food from the Liverpool area
 Stippgrütze- similar food from Westphalia
 Hakkemat-similar dish in Norway (Norwegian link)
 Faggots - similar food from western Britain

References 

Swedish cuisine
Offal
Ground meat
National dishes